East Contra Costa Fire Protection District (ECCFPD) is an agency that is responsible for providing fire protection in the most eastern section of Contra Costa. The district currently has three fire stations with three fire fighters each. Its territory covers 247 square miles and includes two cities, plus much of the county's unincorporated area. The incorporated cities are: Antioch, Brentwood, and Oakley. Unincorporated community areas are Bethel Island, Discovery Bay, Byron, Knightsen and Marsh Creek/Morgan Territory. As of 2020, the district claims that it serves a population of 128,000.  Financial support is primarily from property taxes collected by the county.

Mutual aid agreements
Various fire protection districts have mutual aid agreements, but in May 2019 these were modified based on numbers of engines available at the time the aid was summoned. For example, ECCFPD (Battalion 5) covers Brentwood, Oakley, Discovery Bay, Byron, Bethel Island, Knightsen, Morgan Territory while Contra Costa Fire Protection District (CONFIRE) (Battalion 8) normally covers Antioch, Pittsburg and Bay Point.

CONFIRE has 8 engines, and has already said it is willing to send a maximum of four to another district when requested. However, if one or more of its engines are unavailable for any reason, then it will deduct one from the number it will send. In other words, if all eight are unavailable, then CONFIRE will send none to the requesting district. In such a situation the aid will have to be requested from stations farther away (e.g., Central CC: Concord, Martinez or Pleasant Hill or CALFIRE in Rio Vista, Tracy, Stockton or Livermore.

On June 8, 2020, ECCFPD Fire Chief Brian Helmick announced that as of July 1, 2020, the district will only allow its fire fighters to enter burning structures if occupants' lives are at stake. "Otherwise,...  you need to do the best you can to fight the fire from the exterior to the interior, but you cannot be aggressive and overextend yourself.” Moreover, only a maximum of three of the department's five fire engines will be sent to a structure fire. This new policy is intended to prevent damage to engines that the department cannot afford to replace.

The ECCFPD headquarters is now located in the Brentwood City Hall, 150 City Park Way in Brentwood, California.

Response times
Based on national standards, a fire service in an urban or suburban area should have a station located within five miles of any structure. This is based on having the  first engine arrive on scene within four minutes of leaving the station. However, ECCFPD's 3-station model cannot meet these criteria because funding is inadequate to build and staff new stations. The Dispatcher normally calls for both an ambulance and a fire truck on the first call. If the ambulance arrives first, the EMS crew can start work on the patient(s) immediately, and if no fire is involved, can cancel the fire truck call, letting it return to the station right away. One member of the fire crew is also a trained EMS person, who can quickly assess the medical issues and even start basic life support procedures and prepare the patient for transport to an emergency room.

Pension restructuring
At the end of August, 2020, Chief Helmick announced that the Contra Costa County Employees Retirement Association had granted permission for his district to disconnect from the larger CCCFPD by paying the pensions of its own employees directly instead of through sharing with the costs of other agencies. He said that this would save his district about $1.2 million per year in retirement costs. 

In December 2018, ECCFPD had 24 retirees in the pension plan, while the much larger ConFire had 565 in the plan, resulting in the smaller group subsidizing the larger. ECCFPD will reduce its annual pension cost from $1.17 to $0.79 for every dollar of base pay. The smaller district intends to use the savings to service its own district, rather than continuing its past practice of calling heavily on CONFIRE for aid.

Consolidation with Contra Costa County Fire Protection District 
In 2020 the district commenced a study to consider consolidation with ConFire.  In September 2021, Both Boards of Directors voted to have ConFire annex East Contra Costa Fire District .  When appoved by Contra Costa County LAFCO, the district assets and personnel will be absorbed by ConFire.

Notes

References

External links
 Official website

Firefighting in California
1972 establishments in California
Government of Contra Costa County, California
Fire protection districts in the United States
Government agencies established in 1972